The Wild Eight is an open world survival simulation video game with procedurally-generated world developed by Yakutian company Fntastic also known for their story-driven game Radiant One and published by HypeTrain Digital for multiple platforms. The players assume the role of survivors who find themselves stranded in the harsh wilderness of Alaska and must work together to stay alive. Funding for the game was secured through a successful Kickstarter campaign in May 2016.

An early alpha version was released through Game Jolt on May 23, 2016. This version of the game doesn't include multiplayer mode, but it does showcase the game's visual and play style. It contains resource gathering, hunting, crafting, upgrading and shelter building.

Gameplay

Taking inspiration from Diablo, and more modern indie titles, like Don't Starve, The Wild Eight is based around a team of up to eight players working together to survive after a plane crash. While the survivors await rescue, their lives are threatened by a number of mysterious entities, unseen creatures and objects. The Wild Eight website mentions that players have to develop survival skills such as shelter building, and hunting is definitely on the roster (one screenshot shows the team taking down an animal using knives and clubs, and one player is throwing rocks). The freezing temperatures at night come into play, and there are apparently mutated wolves on the loose.

The Wild Eight can be played in single-player. The final game contains a story-driven campaign and quests.

Development
The Wild Eight is the first big project for Fntastic from Yakutia, the Sakha Republic, but the team has some experience in the casual games sector. Fntastic launched a Kickstarter campaign for The Wild Eight to raise $50,000 and build a community around the game. The project was fully funded with 11 days of the campaign to go. Contributions on Indiegogo InDemand following the Kickstarter campaign pushed the final total to over $60,000 by August 2016.

References

External links

 

2019 video games
Early access video games
Indie video games
Kickstarter-funded video games
Linux games
MacOS games
Permadeath games
PlayStation 4 games
Simulation video games
Video games with Steam Workshop support
Survival video games
Video games developed in Russia
Video games featuring protagonists of selectable gender
Video games set in Alaska
Windows games
Multiplayer and single-player video games